Numerous temples of Augustus, the first Roman emperor, were built in the territories of the Roman Empire. They included the following:

 Temple of Augustus, Pula, Croatia
 Temple of Augustus, Muziris (near Cochin), India
 Temple of Augustus, Caesarea Maritima, Israel
 Temple of Augustus and Livia, Vienne, France
 Temple of Divus Augustus, Nola, Italy
 Temple of Divus Augustus, Rome, Italy
 Temple of Augustus, Barcelona, Spain
 Temple of Augustus, Tarragona, Spain
 Temple of Augustus and Rome, in Ancyra (modern Ankara, Turkey)